AEM rubber, also abbreviated AECM (ISO 1629), is an ethylene acrylic rubber with the formula:

References
 

Rubber